Joseph Rasqui (14 March 1895 – 16 May 1966) was a Luxembourgian racing cyclist. He rode in the 1922 Tour de France.

References

1895 births
1966 deaths
Luxembourgian male cyclists
Place of birth missing